The St. Cloud Metropolitan Transit Commission, branded as Metro Bus, is the primary provider of mass transportation in St. Cloud, Minnesota. Service is provided daily using a fleet of 37 full-sized buses. The agency was formed in 1969 after the private St. Cloud Bus Lines began to cut routes and increase fares, leading the Minnesota State Legislature to establish a Transit Authority to make up for perceived inadequate service.

Nineteen total routes are available in the system, providing access to the community via nearly 700 bus stops. Thirteen city routes are provided, plus the Northstar Link, which connects commuters to the Northstar Line train to Minneapolis. Additionally, five routes are primarily intended for St. Cloud State University (SCSU) students.

Metro Bus is one of the only public transit agencies in the nation to have transit signal priority at all traffic lights. Since 2003, a universal transit pass has been part of SCSU fees, which has greatly increased ridership.  A downtown transit center serves as a transfer point for many lines, and also serves Jefferson Lines intercity buses and Northstar Link service.

Regular routes 
Most of these routes operate in loops originating at the downtown transit center at the corner of 1st Street South and 5th Avenue South. On weekdays, most routes run every half-hour during rush hours and every hour during non-rush hours. On weekends, most routes run every hour.

Route 1: Serves neighborhoods west of downtown, Midtown Square Mall, Crossroads Center, Waite Park, north St. Cloud, St. Cloud Technical and Community College, and the St. Cloud Hospital in a large clockwise loop.
Route 2: Same destinations as Route 1, but in the opposite direction (counter-clockwise).
Route 3: Serves neighborhoods west of downtown, major shopping/retail outlets in west St. Cloud and Waite Park, Crossroads Center, and neighborhoods/apartments in Waite Park.
Route 4: Serves neighborhoods/apartments in north St. Cloud
Route 5: Serves SCSU, neighborhoods/apartments in south St. Cloud, Waite Park, and Crossroads Center,.
Route 6: Serves neighborhoods, apartments, and shopping/retail outlets in east St Cloud in a counter-clockwise loop.
Route 7: Serves neighborhoods, apartments, and shopping/retail outlets in east St Cloud in a clockwise loop. Does not run on weekends.
Route 8: Serves SCSU and neighborhoods/apartments in extreme southeast St. Cloud.
Route 9: Serves neighborhoods/apartments in southeast St. Cloud.
Route 10: Serves neighborhoods and industrial areas in northwest St. Cloud. Departs from McLeland Rd/Encore Capital Gr and does not run on Sundays.
Route 11: Serves SCSU and neighborhoods/apartments southwest of campus.
Route 12: Serves SCSU, neighborhoods south of campus, as well as areas along Route 75 down to I-94.
Route 21: Departs from downtown St. Cloud and makes a counter-clockwise loop around Sauk Rapids and Sartell east of the river. Does not run on weekends.
Route 22: Departs from downtown St. Cloud and makes a clockwise loop around Sauk Rapids and Sartell east of the river.
Route 31: Connects downtown St. Cloud to Sartell via the Sartell Walmart.
Route 32: Makes a large loop around Sartell, departing from the Sartell Walmart.
Route 33: Connects Crossroads Center to Sauk Rapids via the Sauk Rapids Coborn's.

Northstar Link 
The Northstar Link (route 887) is a commuter bus route connecting St. Cloud to Metro Transit's Big Lake station which is currently the northernmost stop on the Northstar Line commuter rail service which opened in 2009.  The train is eventually expected to serve St. Cloud directly, but the Northstar Link bus has taken on the role in the meantime.  The Northstar Link makes three stops in St. Cloud: the downtown transit center, SCSU, and a commuter parking lot at Lincoln Avenue SE and U.S. Highway 10.

On Fridays, a special midday Northstar Link roundtrip designated 887F continues to/from downtown Minneapolis, making additional stops at Elk River, Ramsey, Anoka, and Coon Rapids. The northbound trip treats those Northstar stations as flag stops — disembarking passengers must tell the driver at Minneapolis, boarding passengers must call ahead.

St. Cloud State University routes 
91: Husky Shuttle Day (loop between Wick Science Building and parking lots at south end of campus)
92: Husky Shuttle Night (loop extends up to north side of campus)
93: Sundowner

See also 
 List of bus transit systems in the United States
 Northstar Line
 Metro Transit (Minnesota)

External links 
Metro Bus
Northstar Link

Bus transportation in Minnesota